William Magie (born 23 February 1992) is an English-born American former rugby union player who last played fly-half for the Austin Gilgronis in Major League Rugby. 

He previously played for London Scottish F.C. in the RFU Championship.

Early career
During his school years, Magie captained the University of Leeds rugby team. Magie also led the United States national under-20 rugby union team to the IRB Junior World Rugby Trophy in 2012.

Professional rugby career
Magie signed his first professional contract in 2013 with the Ealing Trailfinders in the English Championship, England's second division. However, he saw little playing time with Ealing during the 2013–14 season. 

Magie signed with the Denver Stampede in early 2016 in the newly-formed PRO Rugby competition. Magie slotted the winning penalty kick to give Denver a 16–13 win over the Ohio Aviators in PRO Rugby's first ever match, a feat for which one magazine named Magie as PRO Rugby's player of the week for the competition's inaugural week.

In 2018, Magie signed with the Glendale Raptors for the inaugural season of Major League Rugby (MLR). By the end of game week 5, Magie was the second-highest points scorer in the league, with a total of 47 points in his first 4 games.

References

American rugby union players
1992 births
Living people
Denver Stampede players
American Raptors players
United States international rugby union players
Rugby union fly-halves
Rugby union fullbacks
Ealing Trailfinders Rugby Club players
London Scottish F.C. players
Austin Gilgronis players
Rugby union players from London